The Rad Slavin cis. 112 Z.C.B.J. Hall, also known as National Hall, is a building in Comstock, Nebraska, United States, that was built in 1909. It was listed on the National Register of Historic Places on November 12, 1992. It historically served as a meeting hall for the Czech community.

See also
 Zapadni Ceska Bratrska Jednota
 Czech-Slovak Protective Society

References

External links

Western Fraternal Life Association
Czech-American culture in Nebraska
Clubhouses on the National Register of Historic Places in Nebraska
Buildings and structures in Valley County, Nebraska
Buildings and structures completed in 1909
National Register of Historic Places in Valley County, Nebraska